Mazda is a Japanese automobile manufacturer.

Mazda may also refer to:

 Ahura Mazda, the primary deity of Zoroastrianism
 Mazda (light bulb), a trademarked name used on incandescent light bulbs and vacuum tubes

Persian words and phrases